The term Invasion of Ireland can refer to several attempted invasions of the island of Ireland including:

 Lebor Gabála Érenn, The Book of Invasions, describing mythological conquests of Ireland, anonymously compiled in the late 11th century.
 Viking invasions of Ireland (8th–11th century).
 Norman invasion of Ireland led by the Earl of Pembroke, supported by King of Leinster, Dermot McMurrough (12th century).
 Scottish invasion by Edward Bruce (1315–18).
 English invasion of Ireland (1399), invasion by Richard II following which he was deposed by Henry IV
 Tudor conquest of Ireland, invasion begun by Henry VIII of England after he was declared King of Ireland (16th century).
 Spanish Landing in Ireland by Habsburg Spain During the Nine Years' War (October 1601) 
 Cromwellian conquest of Ireland, invasion of Ireland by English Parliamentarians during the Wars of the Three Kingdoms (1649–53).
 The Expédition d'Irlande by the French First Republic (December 1796).
 The French invasion of Ireland during the Irish Rebellion of 1798.
 Operation Green, planned but ultimately postponed and then cancelled invasion by Nazi Germany during World War II.